Hrochův Týnec is a town in Chrudim District in the Pardubice Region of the Czech Republic. It has about 2,100 inhabitants.

Administrative parts
Villages of Blansko, Blížňovice, Skalice and Stíčany are administrative parts of Hrochův Týnec.

Geography
It lies in the Svitavy Uplands. It is situated at the confluence of the rivers Novohradka and Ležák.

History
A settlement named Týnec was first mentioned in 1194, but it is not possible to prove that it is Hrochův Týnec. The first trustworthy written mention of Hrochův Týnec is from 1293. It was then a property of the Hroch of Mezilezy family. In 1544, the village was promoted to a market town by Ferdinand II. In 1854, Hrochův Týnec became a town.

Transport
Hrochův Týnec lies on the railway from Chrudim to Moravany.

Sights
Hrochův Týnec Castle was built at the end of the 17th century and rebuilt in 1717. It is a valuable Baroque complex with a castle garden.

The Church of Saint Martin is the landmark of the town centre. The current Baroque appearance dates from 1723–1725.

Notable people
Friedrich Simony (1813–1896), Austrian geographer

References

External links

Populated places in Chrudim District
Cities and towns in the Czech Republic